Andrea M. Berlin is an archaeologist and the James R. Wiseman Chair in Classical Archaeology in the Department of Archaeology at Boston University. She also holds a faculty position in the Elie Wiesel Center for Jewish Studies at Boston University. Before that she held positions at academic institutions, among which were (from 2004 to 2010) the Morse-Alumni Distinguished Teaching Professor of Archaeology in the Department of Classical and Near Eastern Studies at the University of Minnesota. She received her PhD in 1988 from the University of Michigan.

Berlin is an expert in the archaeology and history of the Achaemenid, Hellenistic, and Roman East, with an emphasis on ceramics. She has published widely on the archaeology of Second Temple Judaism and the archaeology of Israel. Berlin has been assistant director of Tel Anafa and Banias excavations and a co-director of the excavations at Tel Kedesh (all in northern Israel). Berlin is the initiator and, since 2012, the main editor of the Levantine Ceramics Project (LCP), which is an open database of ceramics produced in the Levantine region.

Books 
 Berlin, Andrea and Kosmin, Paul, eds (2021): The Middle Maccabees: Archaeology, History, and the Rise of the Hasmonean Kingdom
 Berlin, Andrea and Kosmin, Paul, eds (2019): Spear-Won Land: Sardis from the King's Peace to the Peace of Apamea
 Berlin, Andrea, and Sharon C. Herbert, eds (2012) Tel Anafa II, ii. Glass Vessels, Lamps, Objects of Metal, and Groundstone and Other Stone Tools and Vessels. Kelsey Museum Fieldwork Studies, Ann Arbor, MI.
 Berlin, Andrea (2006) Gamla. Final Reports, Volume I: The Pottery of the Second Temple Period. Israel Antiquities Authority Reports 29. Israel Antiquities Authority, Jerusalem.
 Berlin, Andrea, and Sharon C. Herbert, eds (2003) Excavations at Coptos (Qift) (1988–1992). Journal of Roman Archaeology Supplementary Series 53. Portsmouth, RI.
 Berlin, Andrea, and J. Andrew Overman, eds (2002) The First Jewish Revolt: Archaeology, History, and Ideology. Routledge, London.
 Berlin, Andrea (1997) Excavations at Tel Anafa, vol. II,i. The Persian, Hellenistic, and Roman Plain Wares. Journal of Roman Archaeology Supplementary Series 10.2. Portsmouth, RI.

References 

Living people
American archaeologists
Boston University faculty
University of Michigan alumni
American women archaeologists
Archaeologists of the Near East
Classical archaeologists
Year of birth missing (living people)
American women academics
21st-century American women